Miriam Susan Zach (born October 2, 1954 in Iowa) is an Iowa State University professor and musicologist residing in Gainesville, Florida known for her work in the study of women composers.  Zach's published works in the area of female composers include a CD titled Hidden Treasures: 300 Years of Organ Music by Women Composers which was released in 1998 and the textbook For the Birds: Women Composers Music History Speller, and her collections of music and documentation about women composers formed the base of the International Women Composers' Library, a music history library of which Dr. Zach is the current director.

Education and Professorship
Miriam Zach completed her undergraduate education at Northwestern University before moving on to graduate studies at the University of Chicago.  Afterward, she left the United States and lived in Germany for 5 years, teaching piano at the Universität Bielefeld .

She has taught music history and music and health courses at the University of Florida, where she held the position of Assistant Professor in the Honors Program. Currently she is the Charles and Mary Sukup Endowed Artist in Organ in the Department of Music and Theatre at Iowa State University where she teaches organ (on the Brombaugh pipe organ in the Mary-Ellen Tye Recital Hall) and harpsichord as well as music history and music and architecture courses.

Awards and honors
Dr. Zach has earned several awards for her research and professorship. She earned the honor of being Professor of the Year for 2000-2001 at the University of Florida, one of the largest colleges in the United States .

Zach was also honored with the prestigious title of Charles and Mary Sukup Endowed Artist in Organ at Iowa State University in 2016.

References

External links
 MiriamZach.net

1954 births
American women academics
American musicologists
American women musicologists
University of Florida faculty
Living people
Bienen School of Music alumni
University of Chicago alumni
Academic staff of Bielefeld University
American expatriates in Germany
21st-century American women